Jess Lewis (born July 28, 1947 in Aumsville, Oregon) is a retired amateur wrestler and American football player who played in the National Football League (NFL) for the Houston Oilers in 1970. He graduated from Cascade High School in Turner, Oregon.

College Wrestling
Lewis was an accomplished wrestler for Oregon State, becoming a three-time conference champion (1968–1970), three-time All-American (1968–1970), and a two-time NCAA champion (1969, 1970) in the heavyweight division.  He went on to compete in the 1968 World University Games and the 1968 Summer Olympics as a wrestler for the United States.

College football
Lewis also played college football at Oregon State University where he earned All-American honors as a football player in 1967, and was a two-time All-Pac-8 Conference selection as a defensive tackle.  He was selected
as the team MVP in 1969.

NFL Football
Upon graduating from Oregon State, Lewis was drafted in the 13th round of the 1970 NFL Draft by the Houston Oilers.  The Oilers moved him to linebacker upon drafting him.  Lewis played one season in the NFL.

References

1947 births
American football defensive tackles
American football linebackers
Wrestlers at the 1968 Summer Olympics
American male sport wrestlers
Houston Oilers players
Living people
Olympic wrestlers of the United States
Oregon State Beavers football players
Oregon State Beavers wrestlers
People from Marion County, Oregon
Wrestlers from Oregon
Players of American football from Oregon
Olympic wrestlers of the National Football League